The Duke of York is a Grade II listed public house at 7 Roger Street, Bloomsbury, London WC1N 2PB.

It is on the Campaign for Real Ale's National Inventory of Historic Pub Interiors.

It forms part of Mytre House, built-in 1937-38 by the architect D. E. Harrington.

See also
 List of pubs in London

References

Grade II listed pubs in London
National Inventory Pubs
Buildings and structures in Bloomsbury
Buildings and structures completed in 1938
20th-century architecture in the United Kingdom
Grade II listed buildings in the London Borough of Camden